But Not Really is an album by pianist Les McCann recorded in 1964 and released on the Limelight label.

Reception

Allmusic gave the album 4 stars stating "For fans of McCann's piano work, there are few recordings that showcase it better -- in the studio at least -- than But Not Really".

Track listing 
All compositions by Les McCann except as indicated
 "But Not Really" - 5:14
 "A Little Three-Four" - 5:00
 "Our Delight" (Tadd Dameron) - 3:37
 "Sweetie" (Ernie Freeman) - 6:35
 "We're on the Move Now" - 3:22
 "Jack V. Schwartz" - 4:19
 "Little Freak" - 2:48
 "Yours Is My Heart Alone" (Franz Lehár, Fritz Löhner-Beda) - 9:00

Personnel 
Les McCann - piano
Victor Gaskin - bass
Paul Humphrey - drums

References 

Les McCann albums
1965 albums
Limelight Records albums